Coleophora microxantha is a moth of the family Coleophoridae that is endemic to Algeria.

The larvae feed on Herniaria fruticosa. They feed on the leaves of their host plant.

References

External links

microxantha
Moths of Africa
Endemic fauna of Algeria
Moths described in 1907